Albert E. Hill (October 14, 1870 – January 23, 1933) was an American politician. He served as a member of the Tennessee House of Representatives and the Tennessee Senate, including as Speaker of the Senate from 1915 to 1917. He supported the labor movement and public education.

Early life
Albert E. Hill was born on October 14, 1870.

Career
Hill served as a member of the Tennessee House of Representatives and the Tennessee Senate, including as Speaker of the Senate in 1922. Both in the house and the senate, Hill supported "advances for labor and public schools."

Hill was the founder of the Tennessee State Federation of Labor, and the chair of the Southern chapter of the International Typographical Union. He was also the president of the Nashville Board of Education, and the founder and publisher of the Nashville Labor Advocate.

Death
Hill died on January 23, 1933, in Nashville, Tennessee. A memorial service was held at the East Nashville High School on February 6.

References

1870 births
1933 deaths
Politicians from Nashville, Tennessee
19th-century American newspaper founders
Members of the Tennessee House of Representatives
Tennessee state senators
Trade unionists from Tennessee
20th-century American politicians